Inside the Ethics Committee is a BBC Radio 4 programme, now in its ninth series, presented by Vivienne Parry. Each episode is a discussion of a real life case facing a clinical ethics committee.

Notable guests
Deborah Bowman, Professor of Ethics and Law at St George's, University of London

References

BBC Radio 4 programmes